Băuțar is a commune in Caraș-Severin County, western Romania with a population of 2.813 people. It is composed of four villages: Băuțar, Bucova (Bukova), Cornișoru (Strimba) and Preveciori. It is the only commune in the county located in the historical region of Transylvania; the rest is in the Banat.

References

Communes in Caraș-Severin County
Localities in Transylvania